KFXZ may refer to:

 KFXZ (AM), a radio station (1520 AM) licensed to Lafayette, Louisiana, United States
 KFXZ-FM, a radio station (105.9 FM) licensed to Opelousas, Louisiana, United States